Port Mahon was a port in Kent County, Delaware, United States located along the Delaware Bay at the eastern end of Port Mahon Road, northeast of Little Creek. and served as a port for the town. It is also located nearby Leipsic. Named for the Spanish city, Mahón, it is locally pronounced  "MAY-hon" (not Mah-HONE). It functions as public fishing piers.

See also
Mahon River Light
Little Creek Wildlife Area
Bombay Hook National Wildlife Refuge

References

Unincorporated communities in Kent County, Delaware
Unincorporated communities in Delaware
Beaches of Delaware
Port Mahon
Transportation in Kent County, Delaware